The Mass Is Ended is a 1985 Italian comedy film, written, starring and directed by Nanni Moretti.

Plot
The young priest Father Giulio returns to Rome, his hometown, after a long pilgrimage. Don Giulio hopes to live peacefully with his family and his friends, but discovers that many of them are depressed or frustrated, some of them suicidally so. Father Giulio determines to leave again, but his parents convince him to perform the wedding ceremony for his friend Caesar and his fiancée. Don Giulio rushes through the ceremony and then away from Rome. Once away from the city, he immediately regains happiness.

Cast
Nanni Moretti: don Giulio
Marco Messeri: Saverio
Ferruccio De Ceresa: Giulio's father
Enrica Maria Modugno: Valentina, Giulio's sister
Eugenio Masciari: Eugenio
Luisa De Santis: Luisa De Santis,  Eugenio's wife
Margarita Lozano: Giulio's mother
Roberto Vezzosi: Cesare
Vincenzo Salemme: Andrea
Dario Cantarelli: Gianni
Mauro Fabretti: Simone
Giovanni Buttafava: a lawyer

Accolades
 36th Berlin International Film Festival: Silver Bear – Special Jury Prize, OCIC Award

References

External links
 

1985 comedy films
1985 films
Films directed by Nanni Moretti
1980s Italian-language films
Italian comedy films
Silver Bear Grand Jury Prize winners
Films scored by Nicola Piovani
1980s Italian films